Melissa Hannan (born c. 1962) is an Australian actress, model, TV Host and beauty pageant titleholder who won Miss Australia in 1981. She was also in the Miss World 1981 held in London where she won Miss Oceania and Most photogenic by the World's Press.

After Miss World
Hannan modelled in Europe and Japan. As a singer and songwriter she formed a band called EMI which was a support act to Jose Feliciano when he was on tour in Australia in the early 1990s. Later Hannan became a TV presenter and featured on shows like Hey Hey it's Saturday.  Her father was TV presenter and singer, Jimmy Hannan, and her daughter is producer/illustrator Jaki Jo Hannan.

References

External links
Melissa Hannan Official Website

Australian expatriates in Japan
Australian singer-songwriters
Place of birth missing (living people)
1960s births
Living people
Miss World 1981 delegates
Australian beauty pageant winners
Australian women singer-songwriters